Tandonia rustica is a species of air-breathing, keeled, land slug, a shell-less terrestrial gastropod mollusc in the family Milacidae.

Description
70 mm.- 100 mm. long whitish In colour creamy or reddish to yellowish grey with numerous black dots . The mantle is 40% of body length (preserved specimens) . The mantle is granular with a deep but not conspicuous horseshoe-shaped groove with black streaks. The breathing pore has a pale rim. The keel is yellowish to white. The sole is cream.

The penis and epiphallus form a single long cylindrical organ: penis with a swelling anteriorly, inside with a richly ornamented papilla, epiphallus obviously longer than penis. ,The vas deferens opens symmetrically, the spermatheca is elongate with a sharp pointed end, its duct slightly shorter and with a swelling half-way. The vagina is not much wider than the oviduct, accessory glands are compact duct-like canals, surrounding and opening to the anterior end of  the vagina, The atrium is short.(Francisco Welter Schultes)

Description
This is a keeled slug.

Distribution
This slug is native to Europe.

 Not listed in IUCN red list - not evaluated (NE)
 Czech Republic
 Netherlands
 Poland
 Slovakia
 Great Britain
 Ireland
 and other areas

This species has not yet become established in the USA, but it is considered to represent a potentially serious threat as a pest, an invasive species which could negatively affect agriculture, natural ecosystems, human health or commerce. Therefore, it has been suggested that this species be given top national quarantine significance in the USA.

Habitat
Deciduous and mixed forests on mountain slopes with limestone rock rubble, also in open habitats on calcareous soils.

References

External links
Tandonia rustica at Animalbase taxonomy,short description, distribution, biology,status (threats), images

Milacidae
Gastropods described in 1843
Taxa named by Pierre-Aimé Millet